Jalel Kadri (born on 14 December 1971), is a Tunisian football coach who is currently the head coach of the Tunisian national football team.

Coaching career 
His first coaching positions include AS Djerba, AS Kasserine, AS Gabès and US Monastir. During the 2008–09 season, he was head coach at ES Zarzis, then from spring to summer 2010 at EGS Gafsa, and from November 2011 to May 2012 at Al-Ansar FC. He then coached ES Beni-Khalled from May to September 2012.

In 2013, he was assistant coach of the Tunisian team for a few games. From October 2013, he was once again a freelance coach at Saudi club Al-Nahda. For the 2014–15 season, he accepted this position at Al-Khaleej Club, where he accompanied the team for two seasons. From October 2017, he continued with JS Kairouan, where he would only stay until March 2018. Shortly after, he was then under contract with CA Bizertin, where he remained for the rest of the season. .

In the United Arab Emirates, he took the coaching position for the 2018–19 season at the Emirates Club. In turn, the following season, he remained completely at the Stade Tunisien. From November 2020 to January 2021, he was briefly on the sidelines at Al Ahli Tripoli.

In June 2021, he became assistant coach of the Tunisian national team for the second time. This time under Mondher Kebaier, with whom he accompanied the team to the 2021 Africa Cup of Nations, where he became head coach in the round of 16 because Kebaier contracted Covid-19.

On 23 January 2022, during the match against Nigeria in the round of 16 of the 2021 African Cup of Nations, Jalal Kadri replaced the first coach, Mondher Kebaier, at the helm of the team due to his Covid-19 infection, the match ending with a victory for Tunisia 1–0. On 30 January he was appointed temporary coach after being eliminated from the quarter-finals of the Africon against Burkina Faso. In the process, he led the team to qualify for the 2022 FIFA World Cup, allowing him to become a permanent coach of the senior side. In the 2022 FIFA World Cup, Kadri's Tunisia once again failed to live up expectation as Tunisia failed to advance past the group stage due to the 0–1 defeat to Australia in the World Cup group D, despite Tunisia's heroic 1–0 win over defending champions France in the final match. After the cup, Kadri was allowed to remain in charge of Tunisia until 2024.

Honours

Tunisia 
 Kirin Cup: 2022

References

People from Tozeur
1971 births
Living people
Tunisian football managers
AS Djerba managers
EGS Gafsa managers
AS Kasserine managers
AS Gabès managers
Jendouba Sport managers
ES Zarzis managers
US Monastir (football) managers
Al-Nahda Club (Saudi Arabia) managers
Damac FC managers
ES Beni-Khalled managers
Khaleej FC managers
JS Kairouan managers
Club Athlétique Bizertin managers
Emirates Club managers
Stade Tunisien managers
Al-Ahli SC (Tripoli) managers
Tunisian expatriate football managers
Expatriate football managers in Saudi Arabia
Tunisian expatriate sportspeople in Saudi Arabia
Expatriate football managers in the United Arab Emirates
Tunisian expatriate sportspeople in the United Arab Emirates
Expatriate football managers in Libya
Tunisian expatriate sportspeople in Libya
Tunisian Ligue Professionnelle 1 managers
Saudi Professional League managers
Saudi First Division League managers
UAE Pro League managers
Tunisia national football team managers
2022 FIFA World Cup managers